St. Charles Borromeo Church is a Catholic church and second-oldest ecclesiastical parish in the Archdiocese of New Orleans. The church and grounds are located at 13396 River Road in Destrehan, Louisiana.

Early ecclesiastical parish history

La Paroisse de St. Jean des Allemands
The ecclesiastical parish and chapel, La Paroisse de St. Jean des Allemands (The Parish of St. John, of the Germans), were founded in 1723 in Karlstein by Capuchin missionary priests. The site was on the westbank of the Mississippi River near present-day Taft, Louisiana.

Church history

St. Charles Chapel
In 1740, the ecclesiastical parish and chapel relocated to the present-day site of the church on the eastbank of the Mississippi River. A log cabin structure was built and both the ecclesiastical parish and chapel were renamed St. Charles in honor of St. Charles Borromeo.

Little Red Church

The log cabin chapel built in 1740, burned in 1806 and was replaced by a wood-framed church painted red during that same year. The church became known as the "Little Red Church". It was a famous riverboat landmark where boat captains traditionally paid off their crews. In 1877, a fire destroyed the rectory and left the church without a pastor. Starting in 1890, the church entered a period of interdiction, losing the pastoral support of Archbishop Francis Janssens due to conflicts with the church charter and wardens. In 1917, a parochial charter was adopted and St. Charles Borromeo ecclesiastical parish was reinstated to the diocese by Archbishop James Blenk. In 1921, the "Little Red Church" burned and the current church was built on the property that same year.

St. Charles Borromeo Church
St. Charles Borromeo Church was dedicated on January 25, 1922. It was constructed with a white façade and a Spanish tile roof. A statue of Saint Charles Borromeo is enshrined in front of the church. The altar stone of the church rests on a walnut tree trunk imported from Arona, Italy. The tree is estimated to be four-hundred years old and dates back to the time Charles Borromeo was in Arona, Italy (16th century).

In 1929, a convent was built and the rectory was rebuilt by elevating the ground buildings and closing in the ground level.

Cemetery
A cemetery was established at the site as early as 1723. It was commonly known as "Red Church Cemetery," or "Little Red Church Cemetery" after the Little Red Church was constructed. It is now the St. Charles Borromeo Cemetery. 

The St. Charles Church cemetery is today recognized as the South’s oldest German cemetery. Charles Frederick d'Arensbourg, leader of the German Coast, is buried in the cemetery, but his grave was lost due to the shifting Mississippi River.

The Destréhan Family tombs are located in the cemetery. Louisiana state senator Jean Noël Destréhan, who died in 1823, is buried in the cemetery, but his grave was also lost due to the shifting Mississippi River. He is the namesake for the town, one-time owner of Destrehan Plantation, and the first U.S. Senator elected from Louisiana, along with Allan B. Magruder. Nicolas Noël Destréhan (d. 1848), fourth son of Jean Noël Destréhan, and another son René Noël Destréhan (1807–1836), are buried in the cemetery; as is their sister, Marie Eléonore "Zelia" Destréhan Henderson (1800–1830).

The oldest remaining burial plot is of Elizabeth Dubord, who died in 1777. This plot also contains the remains of François Trepagnier, who died in the 1811 German Coast uprising.

Schools

St. Charles Borromeo School

In 1929, an elementary school was built on the grounds. It was the first parochial school opened between New Orleans and Baton Rouge. It is still located on the church grounds in Destrehan.

St. Charles Borromeo High School
In 1948, a parochial high school, St. Charles Borromeo High School, opened on the church grounds. It was operated by the Sisters of the Congregation of the Immaculate Conception.

In 1960, the Sisters of the Most Holy Sacrament took over operation of the high school and in 1978 it moved to LaPlace, Louisiana becoming St. Charles Catholic High School.

See also
List of churches in the Roman Catholic Archdiocese of New Orleans
Saint Charles Borromeo
St. Charles Parish, Louisiana

References

External links
St. Charles Borromeo Catholic Church

Churches in St. Charles Parish, Louisiana
Roman Catholic churches in Louisiana
French-American culture in Louisiana
Religious organizations established in the 1720s
Roman Catholic churches completed in 1921
20th-century Roman Catholic church buildings in the United States
Roman Catholic Archdiocese of New Orleans
Charles Borromeo